Victor Şevcenco (born 8 September 1991) is a Moldovan professional footballer who plays for Atlantis FC, as a defender.

Career
After one year in Kosovo, Şevcenco returned to Finland and signed with Atlantis FC for the 2020 season.

References

External links

1991 births
Living people
Moldovan footballers
FC Tighina players
TP-47 players
Kokkolan Palloveikot players
Kemi City F.C. players
KF Ballkani players
Atlantis FC players
Moldovan Super Liga players
Veikkausliiga players
Ykkönen players
Kakkonen players
Association football midfielders
Moldovan expatriate footballers
Moldovan expatriate sportspeople in Finland
Moldovan expatriates in Kosovo
Expatriate footballers in Finland
Expatriate footballers in Kosovo